The North Dakota State Bison wrestling team represents North Dakota State University in Fargo, North Dakota. The Bison currently compete in the Big 12 Conference and play their home duals at the Scheels Center. NDSU is currently coached by Roger Kish in his 12th season.

History
North Dakota State wrestling began in 1957 when head coach Tom Neuberger led the team to victory in their first dual meet against Valley City State University. Neuberger passed the coaching reins to Bucky Maughan in 1964. Since that time, NDSU has won four NCAA Division II wrestling titles, 30 individual national champions, and 159 All-Americans.  The first individual National Champions were Bob Backlund and Bill Demaray in 1971. The team has since transitioned to NCAA Division I and emerged from reclassification in 2007.

The Bison have had only three permanent head wrestling coaches in their history. Tom Nueberger coached the team from 1957-1963. During that time, Don Lemnus served as acting coach in 1961.  In 1964 National Wrestling Hall of Fame member Bucky Maughan took over the program and led the team through four Division II team titles and NDSU's transition to Division I.  On May 17, 2011 Bucky Maughan announced his retirement. His replacement would eventually be Roger Kish, who was a two-time NCAA runner-up at the University of Minnesota.

In 2013-14, the Bison wrestling team had its best season to date as a Division I school. The team reached its highest ranking of 20th in the USA Today polls and finished 21st in the national championship. Steven Monk finished third at the NCAA championships at 165 pounds. Monk was the eighth Bison wrestler to earn All-American status and the second since the school completed its transition to Division I, after Trent Sprenkle, who finished fifth at the 125 pound weight class in 2013. In 2015, Hayden Zillmer (6th at 184) and Kurtis Julson (8th at 174) were the only two WWC athletes to earn All-America honors. After the season, it was announced that NDSU and other WWC schools would merge with the Big 12 Conference.

Home meets are currently held at the Scheels Center. The new arena was completed in 2016 after a $50 million renovation of the old Bison Sports Arena. The Bison hosted the Division II wrestling tournament three times in the Bison Sports Arena. Prior to that arena opening in 1970, NDSU competed in the Bentson Bunker Fieldhouse on campus.

Coaches

Source:

Championships
NCAA Division II team titles: 1988, 1998, 2000, 2001

North Central Conference Division II team titles: 1979, 1982, 1983, 1984, 1985, 1986, 1987, 1988, 1989, 1990, 1991, 1992, 1993, 1994, 1998, 2001, 2002, 2004

Western Wrestling Conference team titles: (Division I): 2013, 2014, 2015

Individual accomplishments
Mitch Bengtson

-WWC 141lb champion: 2015

-Daktronics open 141lb champion: 2014

Cordell eaton

-Bison Open 197lb Champion: 2016

Andrew Fogarty

-Bison Open 165lb Champion: 2016

Kyle Gliva

-Bison Open 149lb Champion: 2016

Kurtis Julson

-WWC 174lb champion: 2015

-Daktronics open 174lb champion: 2014

Evan Knutson

-Daktroncis Open 285lb champion: 2014

Tyler McNutt

- Bison Open 184lb Champion: 2016

-Dragon Open White Division 174lb champion: 2014

-Ridgewater Open 174lb champion: 2015

Steven Monk

-Midlands Championships 165lb champion: 2013

Nick O'Brien

-Cobber Open Maroon Division 133lb champion: 2014

-Dragon Open White Division 133lb champion: 2014

-Ridgewater Open 133lb champion: 2015

Charley Popp

-Ridgewater Open 165lb champion: 2015

Clay Ream

-WWC 149lb champion: 2015

- Bison Open 157lb Champion: 2016

Josh Rodriguez

-WWC 125lb champion: 2015

-Bison Open 125lb Champion: 2016

Ben Tynan

-Bison Open 285lb Champion: 2016

Mark Voss

-Ridgewater Open 149lb champion: 2015

Hayden Zillmer

-WWC 184lb champion: 2015

-Bison open 184lb champion: 2014

References

External links
North Dakota State Bison Wrestling website

 
1957 establishments in North Dakota
Sports clubs established in 1957